"Here We Go Again"  is a song by American singer and songwriter Aretha Franklin. It was written by Trina Broussard, Jermaine Dupri and Trey Lorenz for Franklin's thirty-fourth studio album, A Rose Is Still a Rose (1998), while production was helmed by Dupri and Manuel Seal. The song is built around replayed portions of "The Glow of Love" (1980) by Italian-American post-disco group Change. Due to the inclusion of the sample, Mauro Malavasi, David Romani and Wayne K. Garfield are also credited as songwriters. The song was the second single released from A Rose Is Still a Rose in June 1998 and reached number 76 on the Billboard Hot 100, also becoming Franklin's fifth number one on the US Dance Club Songs.

Critical reception
Larry Flick from Billboard wrote, "Although popsters are still basking in the glow of "A Rose Is Still A Rose", R&B tastemakers get to preview another gem from Lady Soul's current opus. This time, she teams up with Jermaine Dupri and Manuel Seal for a shoulder-shakin' jeep cruiser that keeps her on the tip of what kids are vibin', while also keeping it mature enough for older listeners who are less interested in production frills. Pumped by a chorus that simply won't quit, "Here We Go Again" actually has the muscle to be Franklin's biggest multi-format single in ages. How wise of Arista, however, to serve her core audience at R&B radio first."

Credits and personnel
Credits adapted from the liner notes of A Rose Is Still a Rose.
Performance
Lead Vocals: Aretha Franklin
Background Vocals: Trina Broussard
Additional Instruments: Jermaine Dupri & Carl So-Lowe

Production
Co-Produced by Manuel Seal
Record Producer and Mixing Engineer: Jermaine Dupri
Recording and Mixing Engineer: Phil Tan

Charts

References

Aretha Franklin songs
Songs written by Jermaine Dupri
1998 singles
Song recordings produced by Jermaine Dupri
1998 songs
Electronic songs
Songs written by Trey Lorenz
Songs written by Mauro Malavasi
Arista Records singles